Wehadkee Creek is a stream in the U.S. states of Alabama and Georgia. It is a tributary to the Chattahoochee River.

Wehadkee is a name derived from the Creek language meaning "white water creek". A variant name is "Hoithle Tigua Creek".

See also
 McCosh Grist Mill

References

Rivers of Alabama
Rivers of Georgia (U.S. state)
Rivers of Chambers County, Alabama
Rivers of Randolph County, Alabama
Rivers of Troup County, Georgia
Georgia placenames of Native American origin
Alabama placenames of Native American origin